This is a list of operator splitting topics.

General
Alternating direction implicit method — finite difference method for parabolic, hyperbolic, and elliptic partial differential equations
GRADELA — simple gradient elasticity model
Matrix splitting — general method of splitting a matrix operator into a sum or difference of matrices
Paul Tseng — resolved question on convergence of matrix splitting algorithms
PISO algorithm — pressure-velocity calculation for Navier-Stokes equations
Projection method (fluid dynamics) — computational fluid dynamics method
Reactive transport modeling in porous media — modeling of chemical reactions and fluid flow through the Earth's crust
Richard S. Varga — developed matrix splitting
Strang splitting — specific numerical method for solving differential equations using operator splitting

Numerical analysis
Mathematics-related lists
Outlines of mathematics and logic
Wikipedia outlines